Daniel M. Thomas (born 1 January 1937) is a Tanzanian sprinter. He competed in the men's 400 metres at the 1964 Summer Olympics.

References

External links
 

1937 births
Living people
Athletes (track and field) at the 1964 Summer Olympics
Tanzanian male sprinters
Olympic athletes of Tanganyika
Place of birth missing (living people)